Saxis may refer to:

Saxis, Virginia, a town in Accomack County, Virginia, in the United States
, a United States Navy patrol boat in commission during 1917